The Order of Polaris is awarded by the Government of Yukon's Transportation Hall of Fame for meritorious service in Yukon in the field of aviation.

The Order of Polaris was created by the Government of Yukon in 1973, to honour members of the Canada's Aviation Hall of Fame, especially those who flew over Yukon. The medal and scroll were presented by the Commissioner of Yukon (or designate) at a ceremony at the Transportation Hall of Fame in Whitehorse. This medal is not part of the Canadian Honours System; an official Yukon honour, the Order of Yukon, was established in 2018.

Description
The award is a simple, circular, silver medal. The obverse has a symbolic representation of the Polar star above and flanked by simulated aerial exhaust trails or stylized wings. Around the upper half of the medal are the words "Order of Polaris" preceded and followed by a maple leaf.

The reverse on the first series of medals is blank. The second series of medals have the coat of arms for Yukon with the word "YUKON" above it.

The ribbon has equal stripes of the colours of the Flag of Yukon - green, white and blue. For those recipients who flew over the territory during their aviation careers, a maple leaf bar, similar to that worn on the Canadian Volunteer Service Medal 1939–1945, is attached to the medal ribbon.

Eligibility
Any Canadian citizen who is a current or former resident of Yukon is eligible for nomination.

Recipients
There have been 88 appointments (including Chancellors) to the Order of Merit since its inception.

 Agar, Carlyle Clare (Carl)
 Archibald, William Monroe
 Armstrong, Neil J.
 Audette, Julien Joseph
 Austin, John Alexander (Jack)
 Baker, Albert William (Bill)
 Baker, Ronald John
 Baker, Russell Francis
 Balchen, Bernt
 Baldwin, Frederick Walker (Casey)
 Bannock, Russell
 Barker, William George (Bill)
 Bartsch, Dawn 
 Bartsch, Gordon 
 Bazalgette, Ian Willoughby
 Bell, Alexander Graham
 Berry, Arthur Massey (Matt)
 Beurling, George Frederick (Buzz)
 Bishop, William Avery (Billy)
 Blakey, Thurston (Rusty)
 Brintnell, Wilfrid Leigh
 Bristol, Helen Marcelle Harrison
 Brown, Francis Roy
 Burbidge, Maurice (Moss)
 Burke, Carl Frederick
 Capreol, Erskine Leigh
 Caywood, Alfred Beebe (Alf)
 Collins, Kelly
 Collishaw, Raymond (Collie)
 Curtis, Wilfrid Austin
 Davoud, Paul Yettvart
 Dickins, Clennell Haggerston (Punch)
 Dodds, Robert Leslie (Bob)
 Douglas, D.J. (Don) 2009
 Fallow, Maurice D'Arcy Allen
 Fauquier, John Emilius (Johnny)
 Finland, George Harold (Mike)
 Forester, Norman Gladstone (Norm)
 Fowler, Walter Warren (Walt)
 Fox, Thomas Payne (Tommy)
 Foy, James Henry
 Franks, Wilbur Rounding
 Fraser, Douglas Cowan
 Fullerton, Elmer Garfield
 Garratt, Philip Clarke (Phil)
 Gilbert, Walter Edwin
 Godfrey, Albert Earl
 Graham, Stuart
 Grandy, Roy Stanley (Bill)
 Gray, Robert Hampton
 Hartman, Paul Albert
 Hayter, Henry Winston (Harry)
 Hobbs, Basil Deacon
 Hollick-Kenyon, Herbert (Bertie)
 Hopson, Herbert
 Hornell, David Ernest
 Howe, Clarence Decatur
 Hutt, Albert Edward
 Jewitt, William Gladstone
 Kennedy, Harry Marlowe
 Knox, Wilbert George Melvin (Mel)
 Lawrence, Thomas Albert
 Leckie, Robert
 Leigh, Zebulon Lewis (Lewie)
 Lilly, Alexander John (Al)
 Lothian, George Bayliss
 Lucas, Joseph Henry
 MacDougall, Frank Archibald
 MacGill, Elizabeth Muriel Gregory (Elsie)
 MacInnis, Gerald Lester (Gerry)
 MacLaren, Donald Roderick
 MacLeod, Merlin William (Mac)
 May, Wilfrid Reid (Wop)
 May, William Sidney
 McCall, Fred Robert Gordon
 McConachie, George William Grant
 McCurdy, John Alexander Douglas
 McGregor, Gordon Roy
 McLean, Alexander Daniel (Dan)
 McLeod, Alan Arnett
 McMillian, Stanley Ransom (Stan)
 McMullen, Archibald Major (Archie)
 McNair, Robert Wendell (Buck)
 Mead, Bert william 
 Michaud, Almer Leonard (Al)
 Middleton, Robert Bruce
 Moar, Jack
 Munro, Raymond Alan
 Mynarski, Andrew Charles (Andy)
 Neal, George Arthur
 Newson, William Francis Montgomery (Bill)
 Oaks, Harold Anthony (Doc)
 Orr, Marion Alice Powell
 Palmer, John Ender (Jock)
 Phillips, George Hector Reid
 Phipps, Welland Wilfrid (Weldy)
 Plant, John Lawerence
 Reid, Thomas Mayne (Pat)
 Reilly, John Hardisty (Jack)
 Reilly, Moretta Fenton Beall (Molly)
 Richardson, James Armstrong
 Russell, Frank Walter
 Ryder, Lloyd 2007
 Sanderson, William John (Jack)
 Seagrim, Herbert Walter (Herb)
 Seymour, Murton Adams
 Showler, John Gavin (Jack)
 Siers, Thomas William (Tommy)
 Sims, Arthur George (Tim)
 Sloan, John Charles (Jaycee)
 Stedman, Ernest Walter
 Sutherland, Alexander Mackay (Mickey)
 Tomlinson, Samuel Anthony (Sammy)
 Tripp, Leonard John (Len)
 Tudhope, John Henry (Tuddy)
 Turnbull, Wallace Rupert
 Turner, Percival Stanley (Stan)
 Vachon, Joseph Pierre Romeo
 Vanhee, Achille (Archie)
 Williams, Thomas Frederic (Tommy)
 Wilson, Arthur Haliburton
 Wilson, John Armistead
 Woollett, Walter 'Babe'
 Yorath, Dennis Kestell
 Young, Franklin Inglee (Frank)

See also
 List of Canadian awards
 List of Canadian provincial and territorial orders

References

External links
 Canada's Aviation Hall of Fame
 image of the medal

Culture of Yukon
Provincial and territorial orders of Canada
1973 establishments in Yukon